Crimson Tide may refer to:

Arts and entertainment 
 The Crimson Tide, a 1919 book by Robert W. Chambers
 Crimson Tide, 1995 film
 Crimson Tide, a 1995 book by Richard P. Henrick
 The Crimson Tide, a Fighting Fantasy gamebook, 1992
 "Crimson Tide", a song by Destroyer from the 2020 album Have We Met''

Sports
 Alabama Crimson Tide, the intercollegiate athletic varsity teams of the University of Alabama
 Vancouver Island Crimson Tide, a Canadian rugby union team
 Crimson Tide, the Pottsville, Pennsylvania football team
 Crimson Tide, the former name of Spartanburg High School football team

See also
 
 Crimson (disambiguation)
 Red tide, a phenomenon of discoloration of sea surface